The Sinner (Italian: La peccatrice) is a 1940 Italian drama film directed by Amleto Palermi and starring Paola Barbara, Vittorio De Sica, and Fosco Giachetti.

Cast

References

Bibliography 
 Gundle, Stephen. Mussolini's Dream Factory: Film Stardom in Fascist Italy. Berghahn Books, 2013.

External links 
 

1940 drama films
Italian drama films
1940 films
1940s Italian-language films
Films directed by Amleto Palermi
Italian black-and-white films
Films scored by Alessandro Cicognini
1940s Italian films